Milton Galatzer (May 4, 1907 – January 29, 1976) was a Major League Baseball outfielder. He played professionally for the Cleveland Indians and the Cincinnati Reds.

Early life
Galatzer was the middle of three children born to Harry and Ida (née Mishunsnik) Galatzer, and was Jewish. His older brother Barney was born in Russia before the family emigrated to the U.S., while he and his younger sister, Min, were born in Chicago. All three children were renamed by their Irish kindergarten teacher, who "Americanized" their Hebrew names.

Galatzer grew up in a Jewish neighborhood around Roosevelt Road and Maxwell St, and played sandlot baseball. He graduated from Crane High School in Chicago.

Professional career
Galatzer played in his first major league game on June 25, 1933, with the Cleveland Indians. He was in the major league for five seasons, playing with the Indians from 1933 until 1936 and then with the Cincinnati Reds until 1939. His best season was 1935 with the Indians when he had a batting average of .301 in 93 games.

After MLB
After his major league career, Galatzer served in the U.S. Army during World War II. He returned to Chicago after his service, spending most of the rest of his life living in Chicago. He moved to California to live with his sister Min until his death two years later. Galatzer never married and had no children.

Death
Galatzer died on January 29, 1976, in San Francisco, California. He is interred at Ridge Lawn Cemetery in Chicago.

References

External links

 
 Jewish Baseball News: Milt Galatzer
 Baseball Almanac: Milt Galatzer Stats
 Baseball-Reference.com

1907 births
1976 deaths
American people of Russian-Jewish descent
Baseball players from Chicago
Cleveland Indians players
Cincinnati Reds players
Frederick Warriors players
Jewish American baseball players
Jewish Major League Baseball players
Major League Baseball outfielders
Minor league baseball managers
20th-century American Jews